Aberchalder railway station served the village of Aberchalder, in the county of  Inverness-shire in Scotland.

History
It was opened by the Highland Railway (Invergarry and Fort Augustus Railway) on 22 July 1903. It became part of the North British Railway, and so joined the London and North Eastern Railway during the Grouping of 1923. The line closed to passenger traffic in 1933.

The site today
Although the station building has been demolished the platform at Aberchalder remains. The southern end of the platform is intact whilst the remainder has been infilled up to the level of the platform though the coping stones are still clearly visible. The bridge still stands allowing one to overlook the site, which is now used by the logging industry as a site office. The course of the railway can be traced both north and south of the station, that south towards Loch Oich is clearly visible passing through the fields on a shallow raised embankment.

References

External links
 Aberchalder station on navigable O. S. map
 Sub Brit Page 

Disused railway stations in Highland (council area)
Former North British Railway stations
Railway stations in Great Britain opened in 1903
Railway stations in Great Britain closed in 1911
Railway stations in Great Britain opened in 1913
Railway stations in Great Britain closed in 1933